= Honnavile =

- village
- Nickname: Navile
- Location in Karnataka, India Honnavile (India)
- Coordinates: 13°53′54″N 75°39′12″E
- Country: India
- State: Karnataka
- District: Shimoga District

Government
  - Body: Grama Panchayat

Languages
- Time zone: UTC+5:30 (IST)
- Postal code: 577222
- Vehicle registration: KA-14
- Shimoga, Bhadravathi.: Shimoga City

Honnavile is a village in Shimoga district in the central part of the state of Karnataka. This place is located 2 km from state highway BH road. Shimul or Shimoga Milk Union, upcoming IT park near Machenahalli, and Malnad Cancer Hospital are the prominent landmarks.

The village code is 01275100, registered at Ministry of Home Affairs website.
